Union Bank of Nigeria Plc is a commercial bank in Nigeria. It has been operating in Nigeria since 1917.

Overview
Union Bank is a large commercial bank, serving individuals, small and medium-sized companies, as well as large corporations and organizations. In July 2009, it was rated the 556th largest bank in the world and the 14th largest bank in Africa. As of Mar 31, 2018, the bank's asset base was estimated at NGN1, 381 billion (US$4.1billion). The shareholders' equity at that time was estimated at NGN286 billion (US$851 million).

History 

The bank's history can be traced to 1836 when London bankers and British merchants obtained a royal charter from William IV to conduct banking business in the Caribbean. These group of investors then formed Colonial Bank. Following an act of parliament empowering the bank to open more branches beyond the Caribbean, Colonial bank began operations in Nigeria in 1917. Operations started with banking centers in Lagos, Jos and Port-Harcourt. Further centers were opened in financially important areas, in 1918, the bank opened additional centers at Ebute-Metta, Onitsha, Ibadan, Kano and Zaria and then added another branch at Burutu in 1921. During this time, Colonial's banking activities also covered other cities in British West Africa including Accra and Freetown. In 1925, Barclays Bank acquired Colonial Bank, changing the bank's name to Barclays Bank (Dominion, Colonial and Overseas)  and later Barclays Bank (DCO). During the period between 1925 and 1950, commercial expansion was hampered by the Great Depression and World War II, though the bank continued to operate steadily opening a few branches but also closing some branches. In the 1950s, the bank increased operations in Nigeria and by the beginning of 1960 it had a total of 41 branches.

In 1969, Barclays Bank DCO was incorporated in Nigeria, as Barclays Bank of Nigeria Limited, to comply with new banking laws enacted in 1968.

In 1971, the shares of the bank stock were listed on the Nigerian Stock Exchange. In the same year, 8.33% of the bank’s shares were offered to Nigerians. The following year, the Federal Government of Nigeria acquired 51.67% ownership of the bank, leaving Barclays Bank Plc. of London with 40% ownership. In 1979, that 40% was sold to Nigerian individuals and businesses to comply with then recently enacted banking and investment laws. The bank changed its name to Union Bank of Nigeria Plc, to reflect its new ownership structure.

In 1993, the Federal Government of Nigeria completely divested its ownership in the bank. Subsequently, Union Bank of Nigeria Plc. acquired the former Universal Trust Bank Plc and Broad Bank Limited. It also absorbed its former subsidiary Union Merchant Bank Limited.

On June 2nd 2022, TitanTrust Bank Limited brought to closure a deal enabling it to purchase a controlling stake in Union Bank of Nigeria, after almost half a year of discussions by both parties.

Ownership
Titan Trust Limited acquired 89.4 per cent interest in Union Bank from a pool of stakes from exiting major investors, including Atlas Mara and Union Global Partners Limited, but later upped the stake to 93.4 per cent.

Branch Network
The bank maintains a vast network of interconnected branches in all Nigerian states.

Management
The bank's activities are supervised by the board of directors, chaired by Farouk Gumel.

The management board is led by Mudassir Amray, who serves as the Managing Director and Chief Executive Officer of the bank. He resumed as Managing Director and Chief Executive Office of the bank June 2022 after landmark integration between Titan Trust Bank and Union Bank of Nigeria.

See also

 Economy of Nigeria
 List of banks in Nigeria
 Nkem Okocha

References

External links

Google Finance listing for Union Bank of Nigeria

Banks of Nigeria
Banks established in 1917
Companies based in Lagos
Companies listed on the Nigerian Stock Exchange
1917 establishments in Nigeria